Aristidis Konstantinidis was a Greek racing cyclist.  He competed at the 1896 Summer Olympics in Athens.

Olympic success in 1896
Konstantinidis competed in the 10 kilometres, 100 kilometres, and road races. He won the road race, covering the 87 kilometres from Athens to Marathon and back in a time of 3:22:31 despite his bicycle breaking down shortly after turning around and him falling during the return trip. The race was then done with the help of pacemakers, and some sources say that he finished the race on a pacemaker's bicycle, because his bicycle had broken down. Other sources tell that he finished the race with a bicycle from a spectator.

Konstantinidis did not do as well in the track races, finishing fifth in the 10 kilometres after colliding with countryman Georgios Kolettis and not finishing the 100 kilometres.  He was one of seven to not finish out of the nine that started the race.

Olympic games in 1906
In the 1906 Intercalated Games, Konstantinidis participated again, this time in the road race and in the 20 kilometres. He did not finish in the road race, and was eliminated in the second round in the 20 kilometres.

After cycling
Konstantinidis co-founded the Athens Cycling Association.

References

External links

Year of birth missing
Year of death missing
Cyclists at the 1896 Summer Olympics
19th-century sportsmen
Greek male cyclists
Greek track cyclists
Olympic gold medalists for Greece
Olympic cyclists of Greece
Place of birth missing
Olympic medalists in cycling
Medalists at the 1896 Summer Olympics
Place of death missing